Hapıtlı or Gapytly or Khapytly may refer to:
Hapıtlı, Agdash, Azerbaijan
Hapıtlı, Ismailli, Azerbaijan